A master class is a specialized class taught by an expert.

Master class or masterclass with upper-/lower-case variants may also refer to:

 Master Class, a play by Terrence McNally
 Masterclass (TV series), an HBO documentary series
 MasterClass, an online education platform
 Master Class, a play by David Pownall

See also
 Masterclass Media Foundation
 Oprah's Master Class